Theppotsavam, or Theppothsava or float festival, is a Hindu religious festival carried out in Hindu temples in parts of South India, mainly Tamil Nadu and Andhra Pradesh during the month of Chitthirai or Aries. As a part of this festival, the principal idol of the temples is decorated and taken in procession through the tank of the temple.

Some of the temples where the float festival is celebrated are:

 Tirumala Venkateswara Temple
 Meenakshi Amman Temple, Madurai
 Samayapuram Mariamman Temple
 Simhachalam Temple, Visakhapatnam 
 Kanaka Durga Temple, Vijayawada
 Thiyagarajar Temple, Thiruvarur
 Kolaramma Temple, Kolar, Karnataka
 Thiruvarur
 Kapaleeshwarar Temple, Chennai, Tamil Nadu

References 

Festivals in Tamil Nadu
Hindu festivals
Culture of Tiruchirappalli
Religious festivals in India